Cluny is a commune in the Saône-et-Loire department in the region of Bourgogne in eastern France.

Cluny may also refer to:

Abbey of Cluny, a Benedictine monastery in Cluny, department of Saône-et-Loire, France
Cluny, Alberta, a hamlet in Canada
Cluny, Mauritius, a village in the district of Grand Port, Mauritius
Cluny, Fife, a small settlement 7 km (4 ½ miles) north-west of Kirkcaldy, Fife, Scotland.
Cluny, Aberdeenshire, 15 km (9 miles) south-west of Inverurie, near Sauchen, Scotland
Cluny Castle, in the parish of Cluny, 3 km (2 miles) north-north-west of Sauchen, Aberdeenshire
Cluny Harbour, Buckie, Moray, as well as the Cluny Square, the central square in Buckie, containing the Cluny Hotel
William Douglas of Cluny (1430-1475), Scottish nobleman
Loch Cluanie and its eponymous dam, Northwest Highlands, Scotland
 The MacPherson of Cluny, the chief of Clan MacPherson
The Cluny, a live music venue and pub in Newcastle upon Tyne, England
Cluny the Scourge, an anthropomorphic rat and antagonist in the novel Redwall
Cluny – La Sorbonne (Paris Métro), a metro station in the 5th arrondissement of Paris, named for the Hôtel de Cluny

See also
The Cluny (disambiguation)
Henry Cluney, guitarist with Stiff Little Fingers
Clooney (disambiguation)